Yukon is a federal electoral district covering the entire territory of Yukon, Canada. It has been represented in the House of Commons of Canada from 1902 to 1949 and since 1953.

The City of Whitehorse comprises an overwhelmingly large portion of the electorate and thus elections are fought on a comparatively small area.

Demographics

According to the Canada 2016 Census
 Twenty most common mother tongue languages (2016) :  83.4% English, 4.5% French, 2.3% Tagalog, 2.2% German, 0.6% Cantonese, 0.6% Northern Tutchone, 0.5% Spanish, 0.5% Kaska, 0.3% Dutch, 0.3% Mandarin, 0.3% Japanese, 0.3% Panjabi, 0.2% Cebuano, 0.2% Gwi'chin, 0.2% Russian, 0.2% Southern Tutchone, 0.2% Polish, 0.2% Tlingit, 0.2% Czech

Geography
The district includes all of Yukon.

History
The electoral district was created in 1901 with the obligation that Yukon send a Member of Parliament to the House of Commons by January 1, 1903. James Hamilton Ross, the third Commissioner of Yukon, was elected on December 2, 1902.

The riding was abolished in 1947, and the riding of Yukon—Mackenzie River was created including a portion of the Northwest Territories. In 1952, Yukon-Mackenzie River was abolished, and the riding of Yukon was recreated.

This riding did not change as a result of the 2012 redistribution.

Riding associations
Riding associations are the local branches of political parties:

Members of Parliament

This riding has elected the following Members of Parliament:

Current Member of Parliament
Yukon's current Member of Parliament is Brendan Hanley, a member of the Liberal Party who was elected in 2021.

Election results

Yukon (1953-present)

Yukon (1902–1947)

See also
 List of Canadian federal electoral districts
 Past Canadian electoral districts

References
 
 
 
 Expenditures – 2004
 Expenditures – 2000
 Expenditures – 1997

Notes

External links
 Website of the Parliament of Canada

Politics of Yukon
Yukon federal electoral districts